Metro Life Flight is an air ambulance service serving the Cleveland, Ohio area, and is part of the MetroHealth system. The system is fully CAMTS certified, and provides transport between local hospitals, as well as emergency transport to MetroHealth Medical Center, a Level 1 Trauma Center.

History
Metro Life Flight was founded in 1982 as the first air medical program in Northeast Ohio. In 1984 the service switched a dual pilot system. In 2009 the main operating base was moved from MetroHealth Medical Center to three bases in the surrounding area. In 2010, the old fleet of Sikorsky S-76 helicopters was replaced by 3 Eurocopter EC 145s. The program now has two bases, one in Lorain County, and one in Wayne County.

Current Bases
Metro Life Flight operates two aerial bases:
 Lorain County Regional Airport
 Wayne County Airport (Ohio)

Ground operations are conducted out of MetroHealth Medical Center in Cleveland.

Crew
Each flight is staffed by two instrument rated pilots, a physician or nurse practitioner, and a registered nurse. The pilots are mostly ex-military, and are fully trained and certified for night vision goggle operations.

Fleet

The main rotor fleet consists of three EC145s with 2 in service. Each helicopter is capable of caring for patients with serious trauma, acute cardiac emergencies, and childbirth. There has been one incident in the service's 35-year history with a piece of construction material pulled into the rotor system, striking the main rotor, and causing a hard landing.
All ground transport vehicles are equipped with identical capabilities.

References

Air ambulance services in the United States
Organizations based in Cleveland